The 1963 Cornell Big Red football team was an American football team that represented Cornell University during the 1963 NCAA University Division football season. Cornell tied for fourth in the Ivy League . 

In its third season under head coach Tom Harp, the team compiled a 5–4 record but was outscored 165 to 152. Gary Wood was the team captain. 

Cornell's 4–3 conference record tied for fourth place in the Ivy League standings. The Big Red were outscored 144 to 111 by Ivy opponents. 

Cornell played its home games at Schoellkopf Field in Ithaca, New York.

Schedule

References

Cornell
Cornell Big Red football seasons
Cornell Big Red football